Ultravox! is the debut studio album by British new wave band Ultravox. It was recorded at Island Studios in Hammersmith, London in the autumn of 1976 and produced by Ultravox! and Steve Lillywhite with studio assistance from Brian Eno. It was released on 25 February 1977 by Island.

Writing 

The songs "Saturday Night in the City of the Dead" and "Dangerous Rhythm", alongside other songs from the album, were written while the band were named Tiger Lily. The former song pre-dated punk music, written over a year before the emergence of punk. The latter, a reggae influenced song, was released as the first Ultravox single in February 1977 to positive reviews. The band's early ambition to combine 1950s and 1960s pop music with the intensity of raw rock music and glam rock developed into writing longer and more intricate songs like "I Want to Be a Machine". The song "My Sex" includes an early use of a synthesizer. Lyrically the album is mainly about the band's environment, living in London in the mid-1970s, with lyricist John Foxx being heavily influenced by the writings of J. G. Ballard. "Life At Rainbow's End (For All The Tax Exiles On Main Street)" pointedly criticises the hugely popular 'dinosaur' bands of the past, namely The Rolling Stones, who released an album called Exile On Main Street in 1972.

Reception 

Ada Wilson in The Rough Guide to Rock wrote that the album "failed to recapture [Ultravox!'s] on-stage energy". In his retrospective review, Dave Thompson, writing for AllMusic, opined "it was Ultravox! who first showed the kind of dangerous rhythms that keyboards could create. The quintet certainly had their antecedents – Hawkwind, Roxy Music and Kraftwerk to name but a few – but still it was the group's 1977 eponymous debut's grandeur (courtesy of producer Brian Eno), wrapped in the ravaged moods and lyrical themes of collapse and decay that transported '70s rock from the bloated pastures of the past to the futuristic dystopias predicted by punk."

Track listing

Personnel 

 Ultravox!
 Warren Cann – drums, backing vocals
 Chris Cross – bass, backing vocals
 Billy Currie – keyboards, violin
 John Foxx – lead vocals, acoustic guitar on "I Want to Be a Machine", harmonica on "Satday Night in the City of the Dead"
Stevie Shears – guitars

 Technical personnel
 Terry Barham – assistant engineer

References

External links 

 

Albums produced by Brian Eno
Albums produced by Steve Lillywhite
Ultravox albums
1977 debut albums
Island Records albums